Panasonic Lumix DMC-TZ25 is a digital camera by Panasonic Lumix. The highest-resolution pictures it records is 12.1 megapixels, through its 24mm Ultra Wide-Angle Leica DC VARIO-ELMAR.

Property
24 mm LEICA DC
16x optical zoom
High Sensitivity MOS sensor
Full HD movies
POWER O.I.S. with Active mode
Creative Control, Panorama Shot e 3D Photo modes

References

External links
DMC-TZ25 on panasonic.it
Panasonic Lumix DMC-TZ25 review

Point-and-shoot cameras
TZ25